Manoranjan Music channel is a 24x7 Hindi music channel owned by Manoranjan TV Group Limited.

References

Manoranjan Group
Hindi-language television channels in India
Television channels and stations established in 2015
Hindi-language television stations
Television stations in New Delhi
2015 establishments in Delhi